An annular solar eclipse occurred on April 30, 1957. A solar eclipse occurs when the Moon passes between Earth and the Sun, thereby totally or partly obscuring the image of the Sun for a viewer on Earth. An annular solar eclipse occurs when the Moon's apparent diameter is smaller than the Sun's, blocking most of the Sun's light and causing the Sun to look like an annulus (ring). An annular eclipse appears as a partial eclipse over a region of the Earth thousands of kilometres wide. This annular solar eclipse was non-central. Instead, over half of the antumbral shadow fell off into space throughout the eclipse. Gamma had a value of 0.9992.
Annularity was visible from northern Soviet Union (today's Russia) and Bear Island, the southernmost island of Svalbard, Norway.

This was the last of 57 umbral eclipses of Solar Saros 118. The 1st was in 947 AD and the 57th was in 1957. The total duration is 1010 years.

While it was an annular solar eclipse, it was a non-central solar eclipse.

Related eclipses

Solar eclipses of 1957–1960

Saros 118 

It is a part of Saros cycle 118, repeating every 18 years, 11 days, containing 72 events. The series started with partial solar eclipse on May 24, 803 AD. It contains total eclipses from August 19, 947 AD through October 25, 1650, hybrid eclipses on November 4, 1668, and November 15, 1686, and annular eclipses from November 27, 1704, through April 30, 1957. The series ends at member 72 as a partial eclipse on July 15, 2083. The longest duration of total was 6 minutes, 59 seconds on May 16, 1398.

Metonic series

Notes

References

1957 4 30
1957 in science
1957 4 30
April 1957 events